The bronze-tailed comet (Polyonymus caroli) is a species of hummingbird in the "coquettes", tribe Lesbiini of subfamily Lesbiinae. It is endemic to Peru.

Taxonomy and systematics

The bronze-tailed comet is the only member of its genus and has no subspecies. However, at one time the grey-bellied comet (Taphrolesbia griseiventris) was also placed in Polyonymus.

Description

Adult males have dark bronzy green upperparts. Their tail is somewhat long and deeply forked and its central feathers are bronzy green. The upper surface of the other tail feathers are steel blue or purplish becoming bronze at the ends; their undersides are entirely steel blue. They have a white spot behind the eye. The gorget is large and rosy violet to rosy purple, and the rest of the underparts are bronze green. Adult females are similar to the males but duller. Their gorget is smaller and more orange and the tail shorter and less deeply forked. The belly is grayish with green speckles.

Distribution and habitat

The bronze-tailed comet is found on the Pacific slope and dry valleys of the Peruvian Andes from the Department of Cajamarca south into the Department of Arequipa. It inhabits arid to semi-arid montane scrublands and small montane woods.

Behavior

Movement

The bronze-tailed comet is sedentary.

Feeding

The bronze-tailed comet's diet is not known in detail, though it is known to be mostly insectivorous and also eats small arthropods. It forages at all heights but mostly near the ground.

Breeding

The bronze-tailed comet's breeding season appears to include at least November and December but little else is known about the species' breeding phenology. Its nest has not been described.

Vocalization

The bronze-tailed comet's apparent song is "a short trill that rises in pitch and then descends". While foraging it makes ""a dry, rapid chatter: tcht or tchtcht.

Status

The IUCN has assessed the bronze-tailed comet as being of Least Concern. Though its population size is not known it is believed to be stable. It is uncommon, but "occupies areas in the Andes that have been settled by humans for thousands of years, and at least in the short term seems to be little affected by human activities."

References

External links
 Image of bronze-tailed comet  - Polyonymus caroli

bronze-tailed comet
Birds of the Peruvian Andes
Endemic birds of Peru
bronze-tailed comet
Taxonomy articles created by Polbot